Íþróttafélagið Höttur is an Icelandic sports club from Egilsstaðir in the center, of the east side of Iceland. It is primarily known for its basketball, football and track & field departments but also fields departments in badminton, gymnastics, handball, swimming, taekwondo and volleyball. 

The club was founded in 1952 as Ungmennafélagið Höttur. On 19 February 1974 it merged with Knattspyrnufélagið Spyrnir and became Íþróttafélagið Höttur.

Basketball

Men's basketball

Since 2005, Höttur's men's basketball team has played periodically in the top-tier Úrvalsdeild karla.

Women's basketball
Höttur first fielded a women's team in 2019–2020 when it fielded a team in the third-tier 2. deild kvenna.

Football

The club plays its home games at Vilhjálmsvöllur, named after Vilhjálmur Einarsson, the most famous athlete from the area.

Men's football
Höttur men's team plays in 2. deild karla as of 2022.

In 2018, Höttur merged with Huginn Seyðisfjörður and the team started under the name Höttur/Huginn in the 3rd division in 2019.

Current squad

Achievements
2. deild karla:
 2nd place 2011 (Promotion)
3. deild karla: 3
 1993, 2006, 2014
'''Icelandic Men's Football Cup 2009, 4th round (final 16), drew 1–1 to Breiðablik, lost 3–1 after extra time.
Breiðablik went all the way, and won the 2009 Cup.

Women's football
Höttur women's team plays in 2. deild kvenna as of 2018. It fields a joint team with Fjarðarbyggð and Ungmennafélagið Leiknir under the name Fjarðab/Höttur/Leiknir. In 2017 it finished 7th in the 2. deild kvenna.

References

External links 
  
Fan website

Football clubs in Iceland
Association football clubs established in 1944